Balmoral Drive Senior Public School is a middle school located on Balmoral Drive in Brampton, Ontario. The school opened on June 1, 1964. The current principal is Raza Husain and the vice principal is Costen McCann.
The school operates under the Peel District School Board.

Intermediate Enhanced Learning Program

The school offers an Intermediate Enhanced Learning Class for students in grades 6-8 who have been designated as intellectually "gifted". The program gives students a chance to interact with peers with similar abilities, learn things at a more advanced rate, and go beyond the regular curriculum. Most of these students scored at a 98th percentile or higher on their C-CAT tests in grade 4.

Population

The school has 607 students, 70 of which are in French immersion, and 17 of which are in the Intermediate Enhanced Learning Class. 80 students take the bus.

Activities 

The school offers many different extra-curricular activities and sports team in which students can shine. There is a student parliament, yearbook club, writer's craft, environmental club, choir, dance team, art club, step team, ukulele club, chess club, A.V. club, and more. As for sports, the school has many inter-murals and teams such as:

- Flag Football
- Volleyball
- Cross Country
- Softball
- Floor Hockey )
- Cricket
- Badminton
- Basketball
- Ultimate Frisbee
- Soccer
- Track and Field

The school also offers an Outdoor Leadership Program where 20-25 students are selected to participate in outdoor activities such as camping.

References

External links 
 peelschools.org
 Balmoral School Website

Middle schools in Ontario
Schools in the Regional Municipality of Peel
Education in Brampton
Middle schools in Mississauga
Educational institutions established in 1964
1964 establishments in Ontario